Fritz Johan Charles Brommesson (12 August 1903 – 1 September 1978) was a Swedish football midfielder who won a bronze medal at the 1924 Summer Olympics. He played three matches and scored three goals.

References

1903 births
1978 deaths
Association football midfielders
Swedish footballers
Allsvenskan players
Helsingborgs IF players
Footballers at the 1924 Summer Olympics
Medalists at the 1924 Summer Olympics
Olympic footballers of Sweden
Olympic bronze medalists for Sweden
Sweden international footballers
Olympic medalists in football
Sportspeople from Helsingborg
20th-century Swedish people